Zolotukha is a rural locality (a selo) and the administrative center of Zolotukhinsky Selsoviet, Loktevsky District, Altai Krai, Russia. The population was 902 as of 2013. There are 6 streets.

Geography 
Zolotukha is located 25 km south of Gornyak (the district's administrative centre) by road. Burkotovo is the nearest rural locality.

References 

Rural localities in Loktevsky District